The city of Baltimore, Maryland, has been home to two Minor League Baseball teams called the Baltimore Orioles, in addition to the three Major League Baseball teams that have used the name (the first of which played in the American Association in 1882 to 1891, then joined the National League from 1892 to 1899, the second being the charter American League franchise which played for two seasons in 1901 and 1902, and the modern AL team since April 1954.)

Name history
"Orioles" is a traditional name for baseball clubs in Baltimore, after the state bird of Maryland, with the colors of black and orange/gold/yellow.  It was used by major league teams representing the city from 1882 through 1899 in the old American Association and the original National League two decades after its founding in 1876, and by a charter team franchise member of the new American League from 1901 through 1902. The original American League franchise was replaced by a team in  New York City in 1903 and eventually became known as the New York Yankees.

First minor league team, 1903–1914
In 1903, an Oriole minor league team joined the Eastern League (renamed the International League in 1911, and not to be confused with the present day 'Double AA' level, minor league Eastern League). This Orioles team stayed mediocre for the first few years of its existence, but after the arrival of Jack Dunn (1872–1928), as manager, it won the Eastern League pennant in 1908. This E.L./I.L. Orioles team played at the old American League Park (a.k.a. Oriole Park) at the southwest corner of Greenmount Avenue and 29th Street in the Waverly neighborhood of northeast Baltimore.

The 1914 season featured the professional debut of local son, George Herman "Babe" Ruth, but competition from the Baltimore Terrapins of the new Federal League challenge for major league status, with their more modern steel-beamed ballpark across the street, forced Dunn to sell Ruth (to the Boston Red Sox) later in the 1914 season and many of his other players, and eventually temporarily relocate the team to Richmond, Virginia, as the Richmond Climbers, for the 1915 and 1916 seasons.

Second minor league team, 1916–1953

After the Federal League's demise, Dunn returned with an Orioles team in 1916. This team, later in the 1919 I.L. Baseball Season won the International League pennant with 100 victories, the first team to win that many games and went on a championship spree, seldom seen in major or minor league baseball ever since. Featuring another future Hall-of-Fame pitcher in Lefty Grove, the Orioles improved on that in 1920 by winning 110 games, including the last 25 of the season.  In 1921, the Orioles won 27 straight games (a record for consecutive victories by a minor league team that would stand until the Salt Lake City Trappers won 29 in 1987). The Orioles won the League by 20 games over the second place team, and had a home record of 70 wins and 18 losses. Despite their impressive record, however, they lost the "Little World Series" to the American Association's champion Louisville Colonels, 4 games to 1. The Orioles actually led the fourth game, 12–4, but a riot broke out among the Louisville home crowd in the top of the 9th inning, and the game was forfeited to Baltimore, 9–0.  The I.L. Orioles continued to roll over International League opposition for several more seasons straight through to the 1925 Baseball Season.

The team entered the Governors' Cup playoffs in the International circuit in 1936, 1937, and 1940, but did not win another pennant until the "war year" of 1944. The team was leading the League on July 4 of that year, when their home wooden and steel beamed stadium, Oriole Park (formerly Terrapin Park of 1914), burned down. Even after relocating several blocks northwest to the old 1922 football bowl of Municipal Stadium on 33rd Street Boulevard (also known as "Baltimore Stadium"), the team seemed to have a hard time recovering from that loss, playing lackluster ball through the rest of the season and losing their last game, only to strangely "back into the championship" when the second place team, the Newark Bears, also lost their recent games. The Orioles, under manager Alphonse "Tommy" Thomas, went on to win the "Junior World Series" that year, four games to two, against Louisville.  Six years later, with the shackles of war-time baseball cast off, in 1950, under manager Nick Cullop, Baltimore won the league championship again, only to lose the "Junior World Series" to the Columbus Red Birds of Ohio, four games to one. In 2001, the Orioles teams of 1919, 1920, 1921, 1922, 1923, and 1924 were recognized as being among the 100 greatest minor league teams of all time.

Back to the majors
After the 1953 season, the St. Louis Browns moved to Baltimore and took the name of the Baltimore Orioles. The last minor league/International League  Orioles team (of 1916–1953) re-located to Richmond (coincidentally just as had the earlier Orioles team in 1914), this time as the Richmond Virginians from 1954 to 1964, later relocating as today's Toledo Mud Hens franchise in northwest Ohio since 1965.

Championships
The Orioles won the Governors' Cup, the championship of the International League 2 times, and played in the Little World Series 5 times.
1936 – Lost to Buffalo
1937 – Lost to Newark
1940 – Lost to Newark
1944 – Defeated Newark
1950 – Defeated Rochester

Notable players
 Hughie Jennings - 1903-06; Hall of Fame shortstop and manager
Wilbert Robinson - 1903-06; Hall of Fame catcher and manager
Jack Dunn - 1907-11, 1919; second baseman, later manager and owner of the club
Home Run Baker - 1908; Hall of Fame third baseman
Sammy Strang - 1908-10; Major League Baseball third baseman and outfielder
Cy Seymour - 1910-11; Major League Baseball pitcher and outfielder
Fritz Maisel - 1911-13, 1919-28; Major League Baseball third baseman, longest-tenured player in Orioles history
Bob Shawkey - 1912-13; Major League Baseball pitcher
Babe Ruth - 1914; Hall of Fame pitcher and outfielder
Jack Bentley - 1916-17, 1919-22; Major League Baseball pitcher and first baseman 
Max Bishop - 1918-23, 1936; Major League Baseball second baseman
Lefty Grove - 1920-24; Hall of Fame pitcher
Chief Bender - 1923; Hall of Fame pitcher
George Earnshaw - 1924-28; Major League Baseball pitcher
Sherry Magee - 1925-26; Major League Baseball outfielder
Joe Hauser - 1930-31; Major League Baseball first baseman and outfielder
Buzz Arlett - 1932-33; Major League Baseball outfielder
Phil Weintraub - 1938; Major League Baseball first baseman and outfielder
Sherm Lollar - 1943-46; Major League Baseball catcher
Bobby Ávila - 1948; Major League Baseball second baseman

References

St. Louis Browns minor league affiliates
Cleveland Guardians minor league affiliates
Baseball teams established in 1903
Baseball teams disestablished in 1953
Defunct International League teams
Sports teams in Baltimore
Philadelphia Phillies minor league affiliates
1903 establishments in Maryland
1953 disestablishments in Maryland
Defunct baseball teams in Maryland